Quellhuacota (possibly from Aymara qillwa, qiwña, qiwlla Andean gull, quta lake, "gull lake") is a mountain in the Vilcanota mountain range in the Andes of Peru, about  high. It is located in the Cusco Region, Canchis Province, San Pablo District, and in the Puno Region, Melgar Province, Nuñoa District. It is situated southwest of the mountains Jochajucho, Jatun Sallica and Wiqu, and northeast of the mountain Sampu.

References

Mountains of Peru
Mountains of Cusco Region
Mountains of Puno Region